Green Plains is an American company based in Omaha, Nebraska that was founded in 2004. The company is the third largest ethanol fuel producer in North America (as of February 2012). It was reported in early 2012 that the company ships approximately one billion gallons of ethanol per year. The company employs approximately 640 people, and was founded by Barry Ellsworth. Green Plains Inc. is listed on the NASDAQ Stock Exchange as GPRE.

Corporate events
 2014 - Green Plains changed their name from Green Plains Renewable Energy, Inc. to Green Plains Inc. in May 2014.
 2012 - Green Plains completed sale of agribusiness assets including 12 grain elevators in northwestern Iowa and western Tennessee to The Andersons in December 2012.
 XMS Capital Partners served as financial advisor to Green Plains in the transaction.

See also

 Biofuel in the United States
 Ethanol fuel in the United States
 Renewable Fuels Association

References

External links
 "Construction of five-acre algae farm begins at ethanol plant"from Ethanol Producer Magazine

Companies based in Omaha, Nebraska
Companies listed on the Nasdaq
Grain companies of the United States
Alcohol fuel producers